Compania Industrială Griviţa (former Atelierele Leonida and Întreprinderea de Reparații Auto (IRA) Grivița București) is a bus manufacturer based in Chitila, Ilfov county, Romania. The company is also specialized in vehicle servicing and spare parts production. Their main production line is the coach bus called Grivbuz.

Overview
The company started building its own series of buses in 1997 with a midibus prototype.

Their product line includes the:
 Grivbuz 7U midibus built in collaboration with Roman in 2001, and updated in 2003. Such buses have 44 passengers capacity and have been operating in the city of Tulcea.
 Grivbus city bus built in 1999 in three or two doors versions and powered by Renault engine. They have been operating in Cluj-Napoca and Tulcea under public operators and other cities by private owners.
 Grivbuz G07 or Mercedes-Griviţa which is a 7m midibus, based on a Mercedes-Benz Vario chassis with modified body. Has a 27/37 passenger capacity, depending on the version – urban or interurban.
 Grivbuz G12, a 12m coach bus manufactured in two versions – intercity or long-distance coach.  They have been developed in collaboration with Roman in 2004. The engines are either MAN EURO 3 – 285 HP or Renault EURO 3 – 265 HP. The Romanian Gendarmerie owns 50 Grivbuz G12 buses.
 Grivbus/Scania city bus built under Scania/Hess licence since 2006 equipped with a 260 HP EURO 3 engine. This type of buses are operating in the city of Târgu Jiu.

References

Gallery

External links

 Grivbuz vehicles
 Grivbuz (Facut In Romania) 
 Google Maps - Compania Industriala Grivita S.A.

Bus manufacturers of Romania
Vehicle manufacturing companies established in 1993
Romanian brands